Marthinus 'Martiens' le Roux (born 30 March 1951 – 14 October 2006) was a South African rugby union player.

Playing career
Le Roux played his entire provincial career for the Free State and made 162 appearances for his province. He was part of the Free State team that won the province’s first Currie Cup trophy in 1976.

Le Roux made his test debut for the Springboks on 31 May 1980 at Newlands in Cape Town against the touring British and Irish Lions team, captained by Bill Beaumont. He played in all four tests against the Lions and followed it with tests against the South American Jaguars, France and  Ireland. He played in 8 test matches for the Springboks.

Test history

Death
On 14 October 2006, Le Roux and his wife were on their way home after watching the Currie Cup final between the Free State Cheetahs and the Blue Bulls at the Free State Stadium, when they were involved in a motor vehicle accident. Le Roux was seriously injured in the accident and died a few hours later in the Bloemfontein Medi-Clinic.

See also
List of South Africa national rugby union players – Springbok no. 510

References

1951 births
2006 deaths
South African rugby union players
South Africa international rugby union players
Rugby union props
Free State Cheetahs players
People from Nala Local Municipality
Rugby union players from the Free State (province)